Lionel Hunt, better known by his stage name Mr. Short Khop is an American rapper. He encountered Ice Cube in front of a 7 Eleven convenience store in South Central, California. Ice Cube eventually struck a deal with the newcomer, and soon Short Khop made guest appearances in Ice Cube's 1998 War & Peace - Volume 1 (The War Disc). To return the favor, Ice Cube appeared on Short Khop's debut 2001 album, Da Khop Shop. Khop was mentioned in William Shaw's 1999 book Westsider's.  To date, he has not released a follow-up to his debut album.

Discography

Albums

Singles

Guest appearances

References 

Living people
Year of birth missing (living people)
21st-century American rappers
African-American rappers
Gangsta rappers
G-funk artists
Rappers from Los Angeles
21st-century African-American musicians